The World Curling Federation (WCF) is the world governing body for curling accreditation, with offices in Perth, Scotland. It was formed out of the International Curling Federation (ICF), when the push for Olympic Winter Sport status was made. The name was changed in 1990.

The ICF was initially formed in 1966 as a committee of the Royal Caledonian Curling Club in Perth after the success of the Scotch Cup series of world championships held between Canada and Scotland. At the outset, it comprised the associations of Scotland, Canada, Sweden, Norway, Switzerland, and the United States. In the wake of its formation, it sanctioned the World Curling Championships. The WCF currently sanctions 15 international curling events (see below). The WCF is managed by eight Board Directors, one president, three vice-presidents (one from each WCF regional zone - Americas, Europe, Pacific-Asia) and six Board Directors. The six Board Directors must all come from different member associations. All positions on the Board of Directors are elected by WCF member associations. The Board of Directors are supported by and a permanent staff of 20 employees.

There are 67 member associations, with the most recent addition being Curling Jamaica in 2022.

In reaction to the 2022 Russian invasion of Ukraine, in March 2022 the WCF banned the Russian Curling Federation from competing.

Goals
The WCF mission statement reads: "The World Curling Federation represents curling internationally and facilitates the growth of the sport through a network of Member Associations/Federations."

The purpose and aims of the WCF are as follows:
 To represent curling internationally and to facilitate growth of the sport throughout the world
 To promote co-operation and mutual understanding amongst Member Associations and to unite curlers throughout the world
 To Defend and Further the interests of world curling
 To conduct world curling competitions
 To formulate rules of the sport of curling for world competitions and all other competitions approved by the WCF

Member associations

Following is a list of member associations of the World Curling Federation:

Regions in March 2022: 
 Pacific-Asia (18): 14 Asian + 2 Ocean + 2 African Country Pacific-Asia Curling Championships
 Americas (9): Americas Challenge
 Europe (41): European Curling Championships

*The Armenia Curling Federation was suspended for failure to pay subscriptions, and later expelled.

*The Polish Curling Association was suspended for not resolving disputes within Poland's ministry of sport and the Polish Curling Association governance structures.

Executive board
The current executive board as of September 2022 is as follows:

President: Beau Welling (United States)
Vice Presidents: 
Europe: Bent Ånund Ramsfjell (Norway)
Americas: Graham Prouse (Canada)
Pacific-Asia: Hugh Millikin (Australia)
Board of Directors: 
Helena Lingham (Sweden) 
Sergio Mitsuo Vilela (Brazil)
Robin Niven (Scotland) 
Toyo Ogawa (Japan)
Athlete Commission Chair: Jill Officer (Canada)

Former presidents
Former presidents of the WCF and ICF are listed below:

Competitions and championships
The WCF manages many events around the world.

See also 
 World Curling Rankings
 WCF Hall of Fame

Notes

External links 
 
 European Curling Federation

 
Curling governing bodies
Organisations based in Perth, Scotland
Sport in Perth, Scotland
Curling
Sports organizations established in 1966